Off-Leash Area is a contemporary performance company based in Minneapolis, Minnesota. The company focuses on creating original performance pieces that draw on many disciplines in theatre, dance, music, and visual art.  Founded by Jennifer Ilse and Paul Herwig in 1999, Off-Leash Area has gone on to win critical praise and multiple awards for its highly-stylized physical performances and set designs. Herwig and Ilse converted their garage into a mini-theater where they perform rough versions of their plays for small reservation-only audiences.

Awards
 2000 Top Ten Shows of the Year for Z.A.P.! Künst
 2002 Top Ten Shows of the Year for The Sunrise Café
 Ten Best Sets of 2005: Paul Herwig for A Cupboard Full of Hate
 2005 City Pages Artists of the Year
 2005 Ivey Award for Outstanding Production for PSST!
 2006 Ivey Award for Choreography: Gerry Girouard for Crimes and Whispers
 2006 Ten Great Sets/Scenic Design: Paul Herwig for Crimes and Whispers
 2007 Ten Shows with Standout Sets/Designs: Paul Herwig for A Gift For Planet BX63

Shows
1999: The Bellman's Song
2000: The Gryphon
2001: Z.A.P.! Künst; Archy & Mehitabel
2002: The Sunrise Café
2003: Z.A.P.! Künst; The Sunrise Café
2004: Predator/Prey; Philip Guston Standing on His Head Standing Philip Guston on His Head
2005: PSST!; Maggie's Brain; A Cupboard Full of Hate
2006: Philip Guston Standing on His Head Standing Philip Guston on His Head; A Cupboard Full of Hate; Crimes and Whispers

References

External links
Off-Leash Area website

Theatre companies in Minneapolis